Abner Vinícius da Silva Santos (born 27 May 2000), known as Abner Vinícius or simply Abner, is a Brazilian professional footballer who plays as a left-back for Real Betis.

Career

Ponte Preta
Abner began his career playing at youth level for his hometown club Grêmio Desportivo Prudente. He then had a brief spell at Mogi Mirim, before joining Ponte Preta in 2017. He was promoted to the senior team in 2019 and made his professional debut on 16 March 2019, in a Derby Campineiro match against Guarani in the 2019 Campeonato Paulista, which Ponte Preta won 3–0. He scored his first professional goal on 25 May 2019, which was Ponte's third in a 4–2 league win over Paraná.

Athletico Paranaense
On 19 July 2019, Abner joined Athletico Paranaense on a five-year contract for a club record fee. He made his Série A debut with the club eight days later, coming off the bench in a 2–0 away win over Cruzeiro.

Betis
On 15 January 2023, Abner joined La Liga club Real Betis having agreed a contract until 2029. The transfer fee paid to Athletico Paranaense was reported as under €10 million. He joined as a replacement for Álex Moreno.

Career statistics

Honours
Athletico Paranaense
Campeonato Paranaense: 2020
Copa Sudamericana: 2021

Brazil U23
Summer Olympics: 2020

References

External links
 Abner at Athletico Paranaense 
 
 
 
 
 

2000 births
Living people
People from Presidente Prudente, São Paulo
Brazilian footballers
Footballers from São Paulo (state)
Association football fullbacks
Brazil youth international footballers
Campeonato Brasileiro Série A players
Campeonato Brasileiro Série B players
Associação Atlética Ponte Preta players
Club Athletico Paranaense players
Real Betis players
Olympic footballers of Brazil
Footballers at the 2020 Summer Olympics
Olympic medalists in football
Olympic gold medalists for Brazil
Medalists at the 2020 Summer Olympics
Brazilian expatriate footballers
Brazilian expatriate sportspeople in Spain
Expatriate footballers in Spain